The 2003 Sta. Lucia Realtors season was the 11th season of the franchise in the Philippine Basketball Association (PBA).

Draft picks

Transactions

Occurrences
Assistant coach Alfrancis Chua was appointed as the new head coach of Sta.Lucia at the start of the season, Chua replaces Norman Black, whose contract wasn't renewed.

In the Reinforced Conference, import Nate James led the Realtors to five wins in eight games he played until an injury forces Sta.Lucia to bring back Damian Owens. Starting the best-of-three quarterfinal series against Alaska, the Realtors tapped former Red Bull import Ray Tutt as Owens' replacement when Owens himself is nursing a leg injury.

Roster

Game results

All-Filipino Cup

References

Sta. Lucia Realtors seasons
Sta. Lucia